This is a list of the main career statistics of former Brazilian professional tennis player, Gustavo Kuerten. All statistics are according to the ATP World Tour and ITF website. Throughout his career, Kuerten won a total of 28 ATP titles — 20 in singles, including  3 Grand Slam titles, 5 ATP Masters Series tournaments and a Tennis Masters Cup, as well as 8 in doubles.

Significant finals

Grand Slam tournaments

Singles: 3 (3 titles)

Year-end championships

Singles: 1 (1 title)

Masters Series tournaments

Singles: 10 (5 titles, 5 runners-up)

Doubles: 1 (1 runner-up)

Career finals

ATP career finals

Singles: 29 (20 titles, 9 runners-up)

Doubles: 10 (8 titles, 2 runners-up)

Performance timelines 

Davis Cup matches are included in the statistics. Walkovers or qualifying matches are neither official wins nor losses.

Current as far as 2008 French Open.

Singles 

Notes:
Kuerten received a walkover in the third round at the 2000 Rome Masters.

1Held as Stuttgart Masters until 2001, Madrid Masters from 2002 to 2008.

Doubles 

Notes:

1Kuerten and Nicolás Lapentti withdrew before the quarterfinals of the 1999 Australian Open.

Record against top 10 players 
Kuerten's record against players who held a top 10 ranking, with those who reached No. 1 in bold.

Singles 

 Guillermo Cañas 7–0
 Àlex Corretja 7–2
 Magnus Norman 7–3
 Yevgeny Kafelnikov 7–5
 Albert Costa 6–2
 Goran Ivanišević 6–2
 Tommy Haas 5–1
 Wayne Ferreira 5–2
 Ivan Ljubičić 5–2
 Guillermo Coria 4–1
 Nicolás Lapentti 4–2
 Félix Mantilla 4–3
 Carlos Moyá 4–3
 Marat Safin 4–3
 Patrick Rafter 4–4
 Andre Agassi 4–7
 Sergi Bruguera 3–0
 Thomas Muster 3–0
 Jiří Novák 3–0
 Michael Chang 3–2
 Karol Kučera 3–2
 Mariano Puerta 3–2
 Rainer Schüttler 3–2
 Gastón Gaudio 3–3
 Tim Henman 3–5
 Arnaud Clément 2–0
 Nikolay Davydenko 2–0
 Mardy Fish 2–0
 Marc Rosset 2–0
 Alberto Berasategui 2–1
 Roger Federer 2–1
 Fernando González 2–1
 Nicolas Kiefer 2–1
 Andriy Medvedev 2–1
 Nicolás Massú 2–2
 Mark Philippoussis 2–2
 Marcelo Ríos 2–2
 Juan Carlos Ferrero 2–3
 Dominik Hrbatý 2–3
 Sébastien Grosjean 2–4
 Nicolás Almagro 1–0
 James Blake 1–0
 Andrei Chesnokov 1–0
 Richard Gasquet 1–0
 Richard Krajicek 1–0
 David Ferrer 1–1
 Thomas Johansson 1–1
 Andy Roddick 1–1
 Jonas Björkman 1–2
 Todd Martin 1–2
 Pete Sampras 1–2
 Lleyton Hewitt 1–3
 Tommy Robredo 1–4
 Greg Rusedski 1–4
 Mario Ančić 0–1
 Jim Courier 0–1
 Magnus Gustafsson 0–1
 Petr Korda 0–1
 Juan Mónaco 0–1
 David Nalbandian 0–1
 Juan Martín del Potro 0–1
 Thomas Enqvist 0–2
 Paradorn Srichaphan 0–2
 Radek Štěpánek 0–2
 Cédric Pioline 0–3

 *As of June 9, 2008.

Wins per season 

In singles, Kuerten has a 38–36 record against players who were, at the time the match was played, ranked in the top 10.

Doubles

Wins per season

Longest winning streaks

Singles

26-match win streak on clay (2000–2001) 
During this streak, Kuerten won every category of tournament played on clay at the time: Grand Slam, Masters Series, ATP International Series Gold, ATP International Series, and Davis Cup.

ATP Tour career earnings

Career Grand Slam tournament seedings 
The tournaments won by Kuerten are bolded.

Singles

Doubles

Career milestone wins

Singles 

 Bold indicates that he went on to win the event.

Doubles

References

External links

 
 
 

Kuerten, Gustavo